Judo competitions at the 2019 Southeast Asian Games were held at the Laus Group Event Center from 4 to 7 December 2019.

Participating nations
A total of 110 athletes from 9 nations participated (the numbers of athletes are shown in parentheses).

Medal table

Medalists

Kata

Men's combat

Women's combat

References

External links
 

2019 Southeast Asian Games events
2019
Asian Games, Southeast
2019 Asian Games, Southeast